Galo Ricardo Corozo Junco (born August 20, 1990) is an Ecuadorian footballer who plays for Manta F.C. A product of LDU Quito youth system, he earned his first senior cap on October 3, 2009 in a game against Deportivo Cuenca.

Honors
LDU Quito
Serie A: 2010

External links
Corozo's FEF player card 

1990 births
Living people
People from Babahoyo
Ecuadorian footballers
L.D.U. Quito footballers
C.D. Cuenca footballers
C.S.D. Macará footballers
Association football midfielders
21st-century Ecuadorian people